A military junta is a government led by a committee of military leaders. The term junta means "meeting" or "committee" and originated in the national and local junta organized by the Spanish resistance to Napoleon's invasion of Spain in 1808. The term is now used to refer to an authoritarian form of government characterized by oligarchic military dictatorship, as distinguished from other categories of authoritarian rule, specifically strongman (autocratic military dictatorships); machine (oligarchic party dictatorships); and bossism (autocratic party dictatorships).

A junta often comes to power as a result of a coup d'état. The junta may either formally take power as the nation's governing body, with the power to rule by decree, or may wield power by exercising binding (but informal) control over a nominally civilian government. These two forms of junta rule are sometimes called open rule and disguised rule. Disguised rule may take the form of either civilianization or indirect rule. Civilianization occurs when a junta publicly ends its obviously military features, but continues its dominance. For example, the junta may terminate martial law, forgo military uniforms in favor of civilian attire, "colonize" government with former military officers, and make use of political parties or mass organizations. "Indirect rule" involves the junta's exertion of concealed, behind-the-scenes control over a civilian puppet. Indirect rule by the military can include either broad control over the government or control over a narrower set of policy areas, such as military or national security matters.

Since the 1920s, military juntas have been frequently seen in Latin America, typically in the form of an "institutionalized, highly corporate/professional junta" headed by the commanding officers of the different military branches (army, navy, and air force), and sometimes joined by the head of the national police or other key bodies. Political scientist Samuel Finer, writing in 1988, noted that juntas in Latin America tended to be smaller than juntas elsewhere; the median junta had 11 members, while Latin American juntas typically had three or four.  "Corporate" military coups have been distinguished from "factional" military coups. The former are carried out by the armed forces as an institution, led by senior commanders at the top of the military hierarchy, while the latter are carried out by a segment of the armed forces and are often led by mid-ranking officers.

A 2014 study published in the Annual Review of Political Science journal found that military regimes behaved differently from both civilian dictatorships and autocratic military strongmen. The study found that (1) "strongmen and military regimes are more likely to commit human rights abuses and become embroiled in civil wars than are civilian dictatorships"; (2) "military strongmen start more international wars than either military regimes or civilian dictators, perhaps because they have more reason to fear postouster exile, prison, or assassination" and (3) military regimes and civilian dictatorships are more likely to end in democratization, in contrast to the rule of military strongmen, which more often ends by insurgency, popular uprising, or invasion.

Examples

Africa 
  – Patriotic Movement for Safeguard and Restoration (2022–present)
  – Transitional Military Council (2021–2022)
  – Supreme Council of the Armed Forces (2011–2012)
  – Derg (1974–1987)
  – National Committee of Reconciliation and Development (2021–present)
  – People's Redemption Council (1980–1984)
  – Revolutionary Command Council (1969–1977)
  – National Committee for the Salvation of the People (2020–present)
  – Military juntas (1966–1979 and 1983–1998)
  – Transitional Military Council (2019), Military Junta (2021–2022)

Americas 
  – Argentine Revolution (1966–1973), National Reorganization Process (1976–1983)
  – Bolivian military juntas (1970–1971 and 1980–1982)
  – Brazilian military juntas of 1930 (1930–1945) and 1969 (1964–1985)
  – Government Junta (1973–1990)
  – Civic Directory (1931), Junta of Government (1960–1961), Civic-Military Directory (1961–1962), Revolutionary Government Junta (1979–1982)
  – Junta of the 1954 Guatemalan coup d'état
  – Junta that took control in the 1991 coup and was deposed in 1994 (1991–1994)
  – Junta of National Reconstruction (1979–1985)
  – Military junta (1968–1980)

Asia
  – Military governments of Ziaur Rahman (1975–1981) and H.M. Ershad (1982–1990)
  – Military government of Suharto, also called “New Order” that lasted for 32 years (1966–1998).
  – State Peace and Development Council (1988–2011), known as the State Law and Order Restoration Council from 1988 to 1997 and State Administration Council (2021–present)
  – Military governments of Ayub Khan (1958–1969), Yahya Khan (1969–1971), Muhammad Zia-ul-Haq (1977–1988), Pervez Musharraf (1999–2008)
  – Supreme Council for National Reconstruction (1961–1963) 
  – Temporary Provisions against the Communist Rebellion (1948–1991) used by Kuomintang after the fall of Mainland China to the Communists
  – Council for National Security (2006–2008) and National Council for Peace and Order (2014–2019)

Europe
  - 1934 Bulgarian coup d'état (1934–1935)
  – Military Council of the Republic of Georgia – Governed the country from 6 January to 10 March 1992. Replaced by state council led by Eduard Shevardnadze.
  – Regime of the Colonels, officially the "Revolutionary Committee" (1967–1974)
  – Military Council of National Salvation (1981–1983)
  – National Salvation Junta (1974–1975)
  – National Unity Committee (1960–1961) and Council for National Security (1980–1983)

Oceania 
  – Military government of Frank Bainimarama (2006–2014)

See also
Civilian control of the military
Civil–military relations
Stratocracy

References

Military dictatorships
Portuguese words and phrases
Spanish words and phrases